"Unbreakable" is a song by Irish boy band Westlife. It was released on 4 November 2002  by RCA Records and Syco Music as the first and only single from their first greatest hits album, Unbreakable – The Greatest Hits Volume 1 (2002). The song was written by Jörgen Elofsson and John Reid, and produced by Steve Mac. It was composed in the traditional verse–chorus form in G major, with the group's vocals ranging from the chords of D4 to C6.

"Unbreakable" became the band's 11th UK number-one single and also reached number one in their native Ireland. The song has received a silver sales certification in the UK for over 200,000 copies sold. It is the band's 13th-best-selling single in paid-for and combined sales in the UK as of January 2019.

Music video
The music video was filmed on the same beach as the video for the song "If I Let You Go" and the band members are standing on a sign that reads UNBREAKABLE. The video begins with a young woman crying in a graveyard and then it goes into a flashback, in which it shows her and her boyfriend in a Jeep out for a romantic date on the beach. Later, the woman dresses herself for appears to be either a wedding or a prom and waits for her boyfriend to arrive. The man is driving to his girlfriend's home in the Jeep as he holds a rose to give to her. But as he drives, he takes his eyes off the road as he puts the rose on the passenger's seat and crashes on his way home and is killed. At the girlfriend's home, there's a knock on the door and, believing it is her boyfriend, she rushes to answer, but finds that it's a police officer, who regretfully takes off his hat as he tells her about the accident and she falls to her knees as she breaks down in tears. The video ends with the girlfriend at her boyfriend's grave, on which she puts the rose as she cries. Parts of the video was shot in Hotel Rosslyn Annex as well.

Track listings
UK CD1
 "Unbreakable" (single remix)
 "Never Knew I Was Losing You"
 "World of Our Own" (US video)
 Exclusive footage

UK CD2
 "Unbreakable (single remix)
 "Evergreen"
 "World of Our Own" (US mix)
 Westlife fans roll of honour

UK cassette single
 "Unbreakable" (single remix)
 "Never Knew I Was Losing You"

Credits and personnel
Credits are lifted from the Unbreakable – The Greatest Hits Volume 1 album booklet.

Studios
 Engineered at Rokstone Studios (London, England)
 Mastered at 360 Mastering (London, England)

Personnel

 Jörgen Elofsson – writing
 John Reid – writing, additional backing vocals
 Andy Caine – additional backing vocals
 Friðrik "Frizzy" Karlsson – guitars
 Steve Pearce – bass
 Steve Mac – keyboards, production, arrangement, mixing
 Chris Laws – drums, engineering
 Daniel Pursey – percussion, assistant engineering
 Dave Arch – string arrangement
 Matt Howe – engineering
 Robin Sellars – engineering
 Dick Beetham – mastering

Charts

Weekly charts

Year-end charts

Certifications

Cover versions
Irish singer-songwriter Mary Byrne, a finalist on the seventh series of The X Factor, covered the song for her debut studio album Mine & Yours.

References

Westlife songs
2000s ballads
2002 singles
2002 songs
Bertelsmann Music Group singles
Irish Singles Chart number-one singles
Number-one singles in Scotland
Pop ballads
RCA Records singles
Songs written by Jörgen Elofsson
Song recordings produced by Steve Mac
Syco Music singles
UK Singles Chart number-one singles